Bon Ton may refer to:

Ton (le bon ton), a term used to refer to Britain's high society in the early 19th century
Bon Ton (brothel), a brothel chain in New Zealand
The Bon-Ton, a department store company based in New York, New York
Bon Ton (play), a play by David Garrick

See also
 Bonton (disambiguation)